Matías Nicolás Míguez (born 9 February 1994) is an Argentine professional footballer who plays as a defender for Sacachispas.

Career
Míguez played for Acassuso and Fénix at youth level, before starting his senior career with Deportivo Español in 2018. Míguez made the breakthrough during 2018–19, as he made his debut in a 3–0 loss to Deportivo Riestra on 8 September 2018; replacing Nicolás Moreno after eighty-three minutes. His first start arrived a week later in a Primera B Metropolitana fixture with former team Acassuso. He made a total of five appearances in 2018–19, before departing in June 2019 to Tristán Suárez. However, the defender didn't appear competitively for the club. August 2020 saw Míguez join fellow third tier team Sacachispas.

Career statistics
.

References

External links

1994 births
Living people
People from San Isidro, Buenos Aires
Argentine footballers
Association football defenders
Primera B Metropolitana players
Deportivo Español footballers
CSyD Tristán Suárez footballers
Sacachispas Fútbol Club players
Sportspeople from Buenos Aires Province